Barrs Run is a  long 2nd order tributary to Tenmile Creek in Washington County, Pennsylvania.

Course
Barrs Run rises about 0.25 miles east of Marianna, Pennsylvania, and then flows northeast to join Tenmile Creek at Old Zollarsville.

Watershed
Barrs Run drains  of area, receives about 40.6 in/year of precipitation, has a wetness index of 310.46 and is about 66% forested.

See also
List of rivers of Pennsylvania

References

Rivers of Pennsylvania
Rivers of Washington County, Pennsylvania
Allegheny Plateau